Stereocaulon vesuvianum is a species of snow lichen belonging to the family Stereocaulaceae.

Ecology
Stereocaulon vesuvianum is a known host to the lichenicolous fungus species Cercidospora stereocaulorum, Endococcus nanellus and Odontotrema stereocaulocola.

References

Stereocaulaceae
Lichen species
Taxa named by Christiaan Hendrik Persoon
Lichens described in 1810